1 Kings 17 is the seventeenth chapter of the Books of Kings in the Hebrew Bible or the First Book of Kings in the Old Testament of the Christian Bible. The book is a compilation of various annals recording the acts of the kings of Israel and Judah by a Deuteronomic compiler in the seventh century BCE, with a supplement added in the sixth century BCE. This chapter belongs to the section comprising 1 Kings 16:15 to 2 Kings 8:29 which documents the period of Omri's dynasty. The focus of this chapter is the activity of prophet Elijah during the reign of king Ahab in the northern kingdom.

Text
This chapter was originally written in the Hebrew language and since the 16th century is divided into 24 verses.

Textual witnesses
Some early manuscripts containing the text of this chapter in Hebrew are of the Masoretic Text tradition, which includes the Codex Cairensis (895), Aleppo Codex (10th century), and Codex Leningradensis (1008).

There is also a translation into Koine Greek known as the Septuagint, made in the last few centuries BCE. Extant ancient manuscripts of the Septuagint version include Codex Vaticanus (B; B; 4th century) and Codex Alexandrinus (A; A; 5th century).

Elijah's conflict with Ahab and his flight (17:1–6)

Following the list of Ahab's mistake in the previous chapter, prophet Elijah suddenly appeared to confront the king with YHWH's word against Ahab's policy of syncretizing the worship of YHWH and Baal, and declaring the war against Baal (as the god of fertility and rain) that the land would suffer drought and hunger (only YHWH can control rain). This set up a tense conflict between the worship of the two deities which would be resolved in 1 Kings 18:41-5. As soon as he finished with his message, Elijah withdrew to a small east Jordanian river valley, being fed by the usually greedy (ravenous) ravens.

Verse 1
And Elijah the Tishbite, of the inhabitants of Gilead, said to Ahab, "As the Lord God of Israel lives, before whom I stand, there shall not be dew nor rain these years, except at my word."
 "Elijah": his name means: 'My God is YHWH!', and his stories depict him as a man led by God and obedient to him.
"Tishbite": or "from Tishbe", here is a place in Gilead, not a place with similar name in the territory of Naphtali, which was the birthplace of Tobit (Tobit 1:2).
"These years": or "these following years", which were three and a half years according to Luke 4:25 and James 5:17.

Elijah and the widow in Zarephath (17:7–16)

After a period of time, Elijah experienced the same drought as the people of Israel with brook near where he lived running dry, so God sent him to the Sidon region, on the coast of Phoenicia (modern Lebanon), home of Queen Jezebel, and the heartland of Baal worship (cf. 1 Kings 16:31).  Elijah was to find a widow to feed him there by having randomly asked a woman at the gates of Zarephath for water and then for bread. When she claimed, 'as YHWH your God lives', that she and her son are starving themselves, Elijah repeated his wish, but adding the soothing words, 'Do not be afraid', and a prophecy of an endless supply of food, which happened as Elijah had said.

Elijah awakens the dead (17:17–24)

This story as the previous one involves the same three people and deals with the same question of whether it is worthwhile to support the men of God, whose presence might bring not only death (by revealing sins and bestowing punishment, verse 18), but also life. The narrative is closely related to that in 2 Kings 4:18-37, showing that while a prophet 'plays the role of a magician reviving a dead soul by a ritual action', only God has the authority over life and death (the prophet had to plead twice to God).

There are notable parallels of this narrative with the raising of the son of the widow of Nain in Luke 7, especially some verbal parallels. The raising of the son of the woman of Shunem (2 Kings 4) by Elisha is also similar, giving an example of a repeated pattern in the history of redemption.

See also

Related Bible parts: 1 Kings 16, 2 Kings 4, 2 Chronicles 17, Luke 4, Luke 7, James 5

Notes

References

Sources

External links
 Jewish translations:
 Melachim I - I Kings - Chapter 17 (Judaica Press). Hebrew text and English translation [with Rashi's commentary] at Chabad.org
 Christian translations:
 Online Bible at GospelHall.org (ESV, KJV, Darby, American Standard Version, Bible in Basic English)
 1 Kings chapter 17. Bible Gateway

17
Phoenicians in the Hebrew Bible